Aibidil Gaoidheilge agus Caiticiosma ("Irish Alphabet and Catechism") is the first book printed in Ireland in the Irish language. Meant as a Protestant primer, the book was written by John Kearney, a treasurer of St. Patrick's Cathedral, Dublin. It includes a short section on the spelling and sounds of Irish. The production of this book was part of a larger endeavour by Irish Protestants to print the Bible in the Irish language so that the common person could read it. The book was printed on a press which was set up in the home of Alderman John Ussher (Early Modern Irish: Seón Uiser). Ussher, who was a well-known Dublin Protestant, also paid for the venture. Though the printer's identity is unknown, it is possible that William Kearney, a nephew of John Kearney was the printer. 200 copies of the book were printed but only four known copies exist today. In 1995 a copy of the book was bought by Trinity College Library Dublin for £47,700 ($76,463) at Christie's.

Other
 The last paragraph on the cover page states the location and date of the printing: "Do buaileadh so ágcló ghaoidheilge, a mbaile Atha clíath, ar chosdas mhaighisdir Sheón uiser aldarman, ós chion an dhroichid, an 20 lá do Juín 1571" which translates to "Printed in Irish type in Dublin at the expense of master John Ussher, alderman, [at his house] over the bridge, 20 June 1571".

 Digital images of the entire book can be found in the "Special E-collections" of Trinity College Library Dublin.
 The full title is Alphabet of the Irish language and Catechism that is Christian instruction or teaching along with certain articles of the Christian rule that are proper for everyone who would be obedient to the law of God and the Queen in this kingdom. Translated from Latin and English into Irish by John O'Kearney.

See also

 Gaelic type
 Bible translations into Irish

References

External links 

 Aibidil Gaoidheilge & caiticiosma, The Library of Trinity College Dublin, Digital Collections
 High resolution image of the title page: Trinity Access Research Archive (Trinity College Library Dublin)
 Details of Kearney's agreement to print the book: Cregan Library, St. Patrick's College

Irish non-fiction books
1571 in Ireland
Irish-language education
1571 books
Irish-language literature
Irish literature
Irish texts
Christian theology books